Gösta Pihl (20 May 1907 – 20 September 1992) was a Swedish sports shooter. He competed in the 25 m pistol event at the 1952 Summer Olympics.

References

External links
 

1907 births
1992 deaths
Swedish male sport shooters
Olympic shooters of Sweden
Shooters at the 1952 Summer Olympics
People from Gävle
Sportspeople from Gävleborg County